Edgar Gonzague "Sonny" Mouton Jr. (September 22, 1929 – March 24, 2016) was an attorney from Lafayette, Louisiana, who was a Democratic member of the  Louisiana House of Representatives from 1964 to 1966 and the Louisiana State Senate from 1966 to 1980. He ran unsuccessfully for governor in the 1979 nonpartisan blanket primary.

References

http://www.acadianmuseum.com/legends.php?viewID=118

 

1929 births
2016 deaths
Democratic Party members of the Louisiana House of Representatives
Cajun people
Louisiana lawyers
Democratic Party Louisiana state senators
Politicians from Lafayette, Louisiana
Tulane University Law School alumni
Tulane University alumni
Burials in Louisiana
20th-century American lawyers